The Sheraton Kansas City Hotel at Crown Center is a , 45-story hotel located in the Crown Center complex in Kansas City, Missouri. It was Missouri's tallest building from 1980 to 1986. It is now the state's sixth-tallest building and Kansas City's third-tallest building.

It has 733 guestrooms, including 42 suites.

The hotel was formerly topped by a revolving rooftop restaurant, Skies, which closed in 2011 along with the hotel's Peppercorn Duck Club when the hotel became a part of Starwood. The former Skies restaurant reopened as the Sheraton Club Lounge, a private club.

History

Opening
The hotel opened on July 1, 1980 as the Hyatt Regency Kansas City. It is part of the Crown Center complex, built by Hallmark Cards, adjacent to their headquarters, and southeast of the Downtown loop, where most of Kansas City's tallest buildings are located.

Skywalk collapse

On July 17, 1981, 114 people were killed in the Hyatt Regency when the fourth-floor walkway in the atrium collapsed on the second-floor walkway during a tea dance attended by more than 1,600 revelers. An investigation revealed that tie rods supporting the walkway did not meet Kansas City building codes.

Rebranding and renovations
The hotel went through a $5 million reconstruction following the collapse, replacing the skywalks with one large second floor balcony supported by massive pillars, with local authorities saying in 1983 that the building was now "possibly the safest in the country." The hotel was renamed the Hyatt Regency Crown Center in 1987. Starwood took over the hotel November 30, 2011, renaming it the Sheraton Kansas City Hotel at Crown Center the following day and announcing $30 million in renovations and a $5,000 donation to The Skywalk Memorial Foundation.

References

External links
 

Sheraton hotels
Hotels in Kansas City, Missouri
Skyscrapers in Kansas City, Missouri
Buildings and structures with revolving restaurants
Hotel buildings completed in 1980
Hotels established in 1980
Skyscraper hotels in Missouri
Downtown Kansas City